Eurekapnia is a genus of small winter stoneflies in the family Capniidae. There is one described species in Eurekapnia, E. maculata.

References

Further reading

 
 

Plecoptera